Tanyard Branch is a stream in the U.S. state of Georgia. It is a tributary to Yahoola Creek.

Tanyard Branch was so named because of a tanyard which once operated near its course.

References

Rivers of Georgia (U.S. state)
Rivers of Lumpkin County, Georgia